Lompico Creek is a tributary of Zayante Creek in Santa Cruz County, California, United States. The placename of Meehan is associated with a location near the mouth of Lompico Creek as it discharges to Zayante Creek. The geology of this watershed including the mainstem watershed of Zayante Creek is characterized by strata that include Vaqueros Sandstone and Lompico Sandstone.

Line notes

References
 David L. Durham. 1989. California's Geographic Names: A Gazetteer of Historic and Modern Names, 1686 pages 
 C. Michael Hogan, Leda Patmore, David Crimp et al., San Lorenzo Basin Groundwater Recharge and Water Quality Study, Earth Metrics Incorporated, Association of Monterey Bay Area Governments, July 7, 1978

Rivers of Santa Cruz County, California
Rivers of Northern California
Tributaries of the San Lorenzo River